Micrography (from Greek, literally small-writing – "Μικρογραφία"), also called microcalligraphy, is a Jewish form of calligrams developed in the 9th century, with parallels in Christianity and Islam, utilizing minute Hebrew letters to form representational, geometric and abstract designs. Colored micrography is especially distinctive because these rare artworks are customarily rendered in black and white.

Description 
The artwork is created from text that forms an image when viewed at a distance, creating an interplay between the text and image. The photomosaic, whose tiny individual images form a mosaic when viewed from a distance, is a modern analogue. Another modern analogue is ASCII art, where ASCII or extended ASCII characters are arranged to form an image on a computer screen and/or printout.

Motivation 

There is a relationship between this form of art, employing both digital and analogic symbols, and the restrictions on images found in the second commandment. Micrography provides a unique solution to the visual artist who wishes to remain devout in observation of Jewish law, by using only text, not images per se. As similar restrictions exist in certain Muslim societies, this solution has been adapted in Islamic calligraphy to the Arabic alphabet as well.

See also
 Matthias Buchinger

References

External links 
 Micrography: Text Art and Typography
 Leila Avrin, Interlaces and Grotesques: the Art of Hebrew Micrography, Jewish Heritage Online Magazine
 A 13th Century Pentateuch British Library, BL Add. MS 21160
 A German Pentateuch, c. 1300 British Library, BL Add. MS 15282
 Jewish Theological Seminary exhibit on Micrography
 Judaic Treasures of the Library of Congress, from the Jewish Virtual Library
 Dalia-Ruth Halperin, Micrography - a Jewish art, British Library Hebrew manuscripts project. Accessed 2016-05-25.

Visual arts genres
Jewish art
Islamic calligraphy
Hebrew calligraphy